Charles Shepard Chapman (June 2, 1879 – December 15, 1962) was an American painter, perhaps best remembered for his landscape of the Grand Canyon at the American Museum of Natural History.

Early life and education
Chapman was born in Morristown, New York. He studied at the New York School of Art. Chapman was under the mentor-ship of Walter Appleton Clark and William Merritt Chase.

Career

Around 1910, Chapman moved to Leonia, New Jersey, where he maintained his home and studio and ran a school teaching illustration for a few years with Harvey Dunn. He was a teacher at the Art Students League school in Manhattan. Chapman also taught at the University of Wyoming.
In the 1930s and 1940s, Chapman also taught art intermittently in his hometown of Morristown.

References

External links 

 Works by Charles Shepard Chapman at Project Gutenberg

1879 births
1962 deaths
20th-century American painters
American male painters
Artists from New York (state)
Artists from New Jersey
People from Leonia, New Jersey
20th-century American male artists